Pleckstrin is a protein found in platelets. The name derives from platelet and leukocyte C kinase substrate and the KSTR string of amino acids.

It is the source of the name pleckstrin homology domain.

External links
 

Proteins